The Alliance of Patriots of Georgia (APG) is a political party in the republic of Georgia. It was founded in 2012 by leaders from the Resistance Movement, which opposed the government of Mikheil Saakashvili. In the 2014 local elections, it gained an aggregate vote nationwide of 4.6%, exceeding the 4% threshold required to qualify as a political party for government funding. Through party-list voting in 47 cities, it won proportional seat representation on the local councils of 30 municipalities, including Tbilisi. In June 2016, the party formed a bloc with five other parties (Free Georgia, led by Kakha Kukava; Tavisupleba, led by Konstantine Gamsakhurdia; Union of Georgian Traditionalists, led by Akaki Asatiani; New Christian-Democrats, led by Gocha Jojua, and Political Movement of Law Enforcement and Armed Forces Veterans) for the scheduled 2016 parliamentary election, finishing 3rd place in the proportional votе and just passing the electoral threshold of 5%.

History
The party was established in December 2012, by founders including Soso Manjavidze, Davit Tarkhan-Mouravi and Irma Inashvili. Giorgi Lomia is political secretary. The party leadership also includes former warlord Emzar Kvitsiani, a figure that has attracted significant controversy. The Alliance party was based on the Resistance Movement, a group fiercely critical of the former ruling party, the United National Movement.

The party declared as its explicit aim to become a "third force" in Georgian politics. It was critical of both the Georgian Dream and the United National Movement, two dominant political parties, describing them as being part of the same "corrupt elite"; however, its criticism at times focused on the United National Movement, while it mainly denounced the Georgian Dream for not dealing harsher with the United National Movement for the crimes committed during its rule before the Georgian Dream took over in 2012. Even in later years, when the Alliance of Patriots grew more critical of the Georgian Dream and accused it of the rigging the 2020 Georgian parliamentary election, the United National Movement still remained its archenemy. At several times the Alliance of Patriots sought to initiate the process of banning the United National Movement, which it described as running the "criminal regime" from 2003 to 2012.

In the 2014 local elections the Alliance of Patriots of Georgia party received 4.7% of the aggregate vote, meeting the required threshold of 4% to qualify as a political party, and making it eligible for future state funding for elections. It ran in a party-list contest for proportional city assembly seats in 47 of a total of 71 municipalities and cities. In 30 jurisdictions, its party-list voting exceeded 4%, making it eligible for seats on 30 local councils, including that of Tbilisi.

Inashvili finished fourth in the mayoral election in Tbilisi with 5.4% of the vote; the party won two seats in the Tbilisi City Assembly. In addition, Alliance of Patriots of Georgia mayoral candidates qualified for run-off elections against Georgian Dream (GD) candidates in the cities of Poti and Ozurgeti; and Alliance candidates qualified for second-round runoffs for municipal executives in the municipalities of Lanchkhuti and Khulo.

Political positions

The party supports 'Christian and democratic values', and demonstrates itself as a moderate conservative party. It places heavy emphasis on social programs, such as expanded public housing and medical care, as well as pledges to support Georgian folk singing and dance.

The party campaigned against the building of mosques in Adjara, warning of growing Turkish influence and Ankara's alleged designs on the region.

The party supports military neutrality and has appealed to the Georgian government to make corresponding changes in the constitution. It officially favours closer ties with both Russia and the European Union. Those critical of the party from the position of pro-Europeanism are more likely to frame the party as pro-Russian and anti-Western. For example, the United National Movement has requested to ban the APG for its alleged close ties with Russia. The Alliance of Patriots brushed off the criticism, although noting that Georgia should launch a new format of dialogue with Russia for the sake of finding solution to a crisis which Russian-Georgian relations go through.

Television

The Alliance party has a television channel, Objective, run by Inashvili. Davit Tarkhan-Mouravi has a series on the channel in which he lectures on the Bible and Orthodox Christianity. A mathematician, he served in earlier administrations as "head of the state department for information technologies in the early 2000s, and as head of the customs department for several months in 2003."

Electoral performance

Parliamentary election

Local election

References

External links
Website

2012 establishments in Georgia (country)
Christian democratic parties in Asia
Christian democratic parties in Europe
Eurosceptic parties
Georgia (country)–Russia relations
Georgian nationalism
National conservative parties
Nationalist parties in Georgia (country)
Political parties established in 2012
Political parties in Georgia (country)
Right-wing populism in Asia
Right-wing populism in Georgia
Right-wing populist parties
Social conservative parties